Balemla is a village situated in Suryapet district of Telangana, India. It is located 10 km from district headquarters Suryapet.

Education
Arvindaksha School of Engineering & Technology and Arvindaksha College of Pharmacy is situated in the village.

References

Villages in Suryapet district